Athlone is the name given to two bordering townlands in County Westmeath, Ireland. The townlands are in the civil parish of St. Mary's.

The northern townland covers much of the northern area of the town of Athlone, with the M6 motorway cutting through the northern part of the area. The southern townland contains most of the shopping district of the town, including the Athlone Towncentre. The Athlone railway station is also part of the southern townland.

Both townlands are bordered to the west by the River Shannon.

The neighbouring townlands include Cloghanboy (Homan), Clonbrusk, Warrensfields, Ankers Bower, Cloghanboy West, Curragh (Mechum), Golden Island (St George), Loughanaskin, Retreat to the east, and Golden Island (Kilmaine) to the south.

See also 

 Athlone (town)

References 

Townlands of County Westmeath

Athlone